Wangama is a town and ward in Wanging'ombe District in the Njombe Region of the Tanzanian Southern Highlands. The population of the ward, according to the 2002 Tanzanian census, was 3,649.

The ward consists of two towns, or large villages: Wangama and Imalilo. Both of these have rural areas or small villages under them.

References

Wards of Njombe Region